Benoni Orrin Reynolds II (July 26, 1824 – January 19, 1911) was a member of the Wisconsin State Assembly and the Wisconsin State Senate.

Biography
Reynolds was born on July 26, 1824, in Sempronius, New York. In 1848 he married Mary Jane Smith, one of Wisconsin's first female physicians. He graduated from Rush Medical College in 1851 and moved to Ives Grove, Wisconsin, in 1854. During the American Civil War, Reynolds was a surgeon with the 3rd Wisconsin Volunteer Cavalry Regiment of the Union Army. Reynolds died on January 19, 1911, in Lake Geneva, Wisconsin.

Political career
Reynolds was a member of the Assembly in 1876 and of the Senate from 1878 to 1879. Additionally, he was Mayor of Geneva, Wisconsin, from 1874 to 1876. He was a Republican.

References

People from Sempronius, New York
People from Yorkville, Wisconsin
People from Geneva, Wisconsin
Republican Party Wisconsin state senators
Republican Party members of the Wisconsin State Assembly
Mayors of places in Wisconsin
People of Wisconsin in the American Civil War
Union Army officers
Physicians from Wisconsin
Rush Medical College alumni
1824 births
1911 deaths
19th-century American politicians